Psychopathia Sexualis is an 1886 book by Richard von Krafft-Ebing.

Psychopathia Sexualis may also refer to:
 Psychopathia Sexualis, a controversial comic by Miguel Ángel Martín
 Psychopathia Sexualis, an album by The Makers
 Psychopathia Sexualis (album), a 1982 album by Whitehouse
 Psychopathia Sexualis (film), a 2006 film directed by Bret Wood
 Psychopathia Sexualis (Kaan book), an 1844 moral psychology book about human sexuality by Heinrich Kaan
 Psychopathia Sexualis (play), a 1998 play by John Patrick Shanley